The 1970 NCAA College Division basketball tournament involved 32 schools playing in a single-elimination tournament to determine the national champion of men's NCAA College Division college basketball as a culmination of the 1969-70 NCAA College Division men's basketball season. It was won by the Philadelphia College of Textiles & Science (then-known colloquially as "Philadelphia Textile", later known as Philadelphia University, and now as Thomas Jefferson University) and Tennessee State's Ted McClain was the Most Outstanding Player.

American International College's tournament appearance was later vacated due to NCAA rules violations.

Regional participants

*tournament appearance vacated

Regionals

Mideast - Reading, Pennsylvania
Location: Bollman Center Host: Cheyney State College

Third Place - Cheyney 94, Youngstown State 91

New England - Worcester, Massachusetts
Location: Andrew Laska Gymnasium Host: Assumption College

Third Place - Springfield 109, St. Anselm 103

Far West - Tacoma, Washington
Location: Memorial Fieldhouse Host: University of Puget Sound

Third Place -Boise State 63, Sacramento State 61

Great Lakes - Mount Pleasant, Michigan
Location: CMU Fieldhouse Host: Central Michigan University

Third Place - Capital 83, Wayne State (MI) 80

East - Buffalo, New York
Location: unknown Host: Buffalo State College

Third Place - Hartwick 78, Stony Brook 70

South Atlantic - Statesboro, Georgia
Location: Hanner Fieldhouse Host: Georgia Southern College

Third Place - Old Dominion 93, Mount St. Mary's 90

South - Owensboro, Kentucky
Location: Owensboro Sportscenter Host: Kentucky Wesleyan College

Third Place - Bellarmine 114, Transylvania 72

Midwest - Brookings, South Dakota
Location: The Barn Host: South Dakota State University

Third Place - SW Missouri State 76, Cornell 65

*denotes each overtime played

National Finals - Evansville, Indiana
Location: Roberts Municipal Stadium Host: University of Evansville

Third Place - UC Riverside 94, Buffalo State 83

*denotes each overtime played

All-tournament team
 Howard Lee (UC Riverside)
 Ted McClain (Tennessee State)
 John Pierantozzi (Philadelphia Textile)
 Carl Poole (Philadelphia Textile)
 Randy Smith (Buffalo State)

See also
 1970 NCAA University Division basketball tournament
 1970 NAIA Basketball Tournament

References

Sources
 2010 NCAA Men's Basketball Championship Tournament Records and Statistics: Division II men's basketball Championship
 1970 NCAA College Division Men's Basketball Tournament jonfmorse.com

NCAA Division II men's basketball tournament
Tournament
NCAA College Division basketball tournament
NCAA College Division basketball tournament